The 1988–89 Soviet Cup was cup competition of the Soviet Union. The runner-up of the competition Torpedo Moscow qualified for the continental tournament.

Competition schedule

First preliminary round
All games took place on May 2, 1988.

Second preliminary round
Games took place on May 22, 1988.

Round of 32
First leg games took place on June 3–5, 1988, while second leg games were scheduled on July 19–21. Game between Dynamo K and Guria was played on July 16 and September 5.

Round of 16
First leg games all took place on September 12, 1988, while most second leg games were played on September 30 - October 3. Games between Traktor and Shakhter was played on October 15, between Dynamo K. and Zalgiris on November 8, while game between Neftchi and Dynamo Mn was scheduled for next year on March 7.

Quarter-finals
All games were scheduled on 29 April 1989, while the match between Spartak and Dynamo Tbilisi was played on 17 May.

Semi-finals
The match between Torpedo and Dynamo Kyiv was played on 19 May 1989, while the game between Dnepr Dnepropetrovsk and Dynamo Tbilisi was played on May 21.

Final

External links
 Complete calendar

Soviet Cup seasons
Cup
Cup
Soviet Cup